Pieter Ernst Scholtz (born ) is a South African rugby union player for the  in the Top 14. His regular position is tighthead prop.

Career

Griquas

Scholtz grew up in the Northern Cape, where he was eligible for represent  in provincial competition. He did so from 2007 to 2012; in 2007, he was included in their squad that played at the Under-13 Craven Week in Krugersdorp and he progressed through the age levels, representing them at the Under-16 Grant Khomo Week in 2010 and the Under-18 Craven Week in 2011.

Golden Lions

Scholtz moved to Johannesburg to join the  Academy prior to the 2013 season. He firmly established himself as the first-choice tighthead prop for the  side during the 2013 Under-19 Provincial Championship, starting thirteen of their fourteen matches in the competition.

Despite being in the Under-20 age-group, he started eight of the s' 13 matches in the 2014 Under-21 Provincial Championship.

He once again played for the Under-21 side in the 2015 Under-21 Provincial Championship Group A, but was also included in the starting line-up for the Golden Lions' final match in the 2015 Currie Cup Premier Division regular season and made his Currie Cup debut as they beat his former side  29–19 to finish the season unbeaten and finishing top of the log.

Europe
On 11 November 2020, Scholtz would join Welsh region Scarlets in the Pro14 competition for the remainder of the 2020-21 season.

On 9 June 2021, Scholtz signs for English side Wasps in the Premiership Rugby competition ahead of the 2021-22 season.

On 27 June 2022, Scholtz would leave Wasps as he moves to France to join Bayonne in the Top 14 competition ahead of the 2022-23 season.

References

South African rugby union players
Living people
1994 births
Rugby union players from Pretoria
Rugby union props
Golden Lions players
Southern Kings players
Lions (United Rugby Championship) players
Pumas (Currie Cup) players
Eastern Province Elephants players
Scarlets players
Wasps RFC players